Tour Pleyel is a skyscraper of mixed use, both residential and commercial, located in the commune of Saint-Denis in the suburbs of Paris, France.

Built in 1972, the tower is 129 metres tall. At the top is a large turning advertising sign, in place since 1997 (the advertisement was firstly for Philips, then for Siemens from 2006 to 2013, and is currently for Kia Motors). Including that advertising sign, the total height of the tower is 143 m.

The tower has been built at the former location of the Pleyel et Cie factories. Several projects have been proposed since 1959, the one which had been adopted was planning the building of 4 identical towers in the middle of a large urban park of 4 ha. Plans for heliports on the roofs of the towers were even made. Only one of the originally planned towers has been built.

The tower is located nearby the metro station of Carrefour Pleyel on Line 13.

See also 
 Skyscraper
 List of tallest structures in Paris

References 

Pleyel
Pleyel
Buildings and structures completed in 1972
Pleyel
Skyscrapers in France